Just Another Night was a professional wrestling live event produced by Extreme Championship Wrestling (ECW) on February 23, 1996. The event was held in the Briarcliffe Fieldhouse in Glenolden, Pennsylvania in the United States. A "fan cam" recording of the event was released on DVD by RF Video, while the event was later made available for streaming on the WWE Network. The bout between Bam Bam Bigelow and Cactus Jack was also included on the 2015 compilation DVD ECW Unreleased Vol. 3.

Event 

The event was attended by 493 people.

The opening bout was a tag team match pitting the Bad Crew against Joel Hartgood and J.T. Smith. At the outset of the match, Smith gave Hartgood a series of chair shots and then walked out on him, leaving him outnumbered by the Bad Crew. The Bad Crew went on to win the bout, pinning Hartgood after giving him a powerbomb followed by a diving splash. After the match, the Sandman came to the ring and hit the Bad Crew and Hartgood with his Singapore cane.

The second bout was another tag team match, this one pitting the Pitbulls against Stevie Richards and the Blue Meanie. The match was won by the Pitbulls, who pinned the Blue Meanie following a superbomb.

The third bout was a singles match between ECW commissioner Tod Gordon and manager Bill Alfonso. Alfonso won the bout by pinfall after his client, Taz, hit Gordon. After the match, Alfonso and Taz attempted to give Gordon a chair shot but were driven off by Bam Bam Bigelow.

The fourth bout was a singles match between Mikey Whipwreck and El Puerto Riqueño. The match was won by Whipwreck.

The fifth bout was scheduled to be ECW World Tag Team Champions the Eliminators defending their titles against the Dudley Brothers. Before the match, The Eliminators performed Total Elimination on Dances with Dudley, injuring him and leaving his partner Buh Buh Ray Dudley outnumbered. After Dudley wrestled alone for several minutes, Hack Meyers came to the ring to replace Dances with Dudley. The Eliminators went on to win the match, pinning Meyers following Total Elimination.

The sixth bout was a singles match between Axl Rotten and the Sandman. The match was won by the Sandman by pinfall following a diving leg drop.

The seventh bout saw ECW World Television Champion 2 Cold Scorpio defend his title against Sabu in a rematch from Cyberslam. The match ended in a time limit draw after 20 minutes.

The eighth bout was a singles match between Bam Bam Bigelow and Cactus Jack. At the time of the match, Cactus Jack was soon to leave ECW to join the World Wrestling Federation, while Bigelow had recently left the Federation, debuting in ECW earlier that month at Big Apple Blizzard Blast. Bigelow went on to win the match by pinfall following a lariat. After the match, Cactus Jack, Stevie Richards, the Blue Meanie, and Taz attacked Bigelow, with Taz applying the Tazmission to him.

The main event saw ECW World Heavyweight Champion Raven defend his title against Shane Douglas. During the match, Brian Pillman came to ringside disguised as a photographer, then distracted Douglas with repeated camera flashes. Following repeated interference from Raven's Nest, Raven won the bout by pinfall following an Evenflow DDT onto a chair. After the match, Raven's Nest attacked Douglas until The Sandman came to the ring and drove them away, after which Douglas convinced him to form an alliance to take the ECW World Heavyweight Championship away from Raven.

Results

References 

1996 in professional wrestling
Events in Pennsylvania
Extreme Championship Wrestling supercards and pay-per-view events
February 1996 events in the United States
Professional wrestling in Pennsylvania